In 2008 the Newcastle Knights took part in the 100th year of the Telstra Premiership, finishing the season 9th.

Results

References

Newcastle Knights seasons
Newcastle Knights season